John Laurence Rentoul (6 July 1845 – 15 April 1926), was a member of the Presbyterian clergy and a poet.

Early life
John Laurence Rentoul was born in Garvagh, County Londonderry, Ireland, fourth son of the Reverend James Buchan Rentoul, D.D. and his wife Sarah, née Wilson. He was baptised on 10 August 1845 in his father’s church (now known as Main Street Presbyterian), Garvagh as the Baptismal register records. He was educated at Queen's College, Belfast, where he graduated B.A. in 1867 and M.A. in 1868, with first-class honours and the gold medal for English literature, history and economic science. He also did some post-graduate work at Leipzig, Germany 1878-79 en route to Australia.

Career
Rentoul was ordained a minister of the Presbyterian Church of England in 1872 and became incumbent of St George's Church, Southport, Lancashire. While at Southport, Rentoul married Annie Isobel, daughter of D. T. Rattray on 30 October 1878. The wealthy congregation of St George's Church, East St Kilda, Victoria, Australia had been seeking a minister from the British Isles and Rentoul was nominated by London preacher Oswald Dykes. Rentoul and his wife arrived in Australia in 1879. Five years later Rentoul was appointed professor in the theological hall, Ormond College (University of Melbourne), his subjects being Hebrew and Old Testament Criticism, New Testament Greek, and Christian Philosophy. In 1884, Rentoul was given the degree of Doctor of Divinity by the Theological Faculty of Ireland.

At Ormond College, Rentoul had a great influence over many generations of candidates for the Presbyterian ministry, and was a conspicuous figure in all the counsels of his church. He showed great ability in conducting religious controversies, for which he was equipped with wide reading and knowledge of the languages of the original texts. He stated once that he never entered on a fight willingly, but once the contest had started he fought with great vigor and, many of his friends thought, with a full appreciation of the joy of combat. It was not for nothing that he was popularly known as "Fighting Larry"; but he had no ill-will to his opponents and never bore rancor. He was made moderator-general of the Presbyterian Church of Australia for 1912–14, and when World War I broke out was appointed chaplain-general of the Australian Imperial Force.

Rentoul's last years were clouded by the long illness of his wife following an accident, and the nervous breakdown of his younger son Ormond, a youth of extraordinary promise, while studying for his examinations.

Rentoul died suddenly on 15 April 1926 leaving a widow, two sons and two daughters. He was buried in St Kilda Cemetery following a funeral service at Scots' Church, Melbourne.

Legacy
Rentoul was the author of From Far Lands; Poems of North and South (1914) and At Vancouver's Well and Other Poems of South and North (1917). His poetry has been praised, a good example of it is "Australia" which was included in The Oxford Book of Australasian Verse. In prose Rentoul published in 1896, The Early Church and the Roman Claims, which ran into six editions. He also wrote The Church at Home; Prayers for Australian Households, and several pamphlets.

Rentoul was somewhat frail-looking but was in reality strong and active, showing much endurance during his yearly trout-fishing holidays in New Zealand. He was interested in the Australian Aborigines and all oppressed people, and incurred some odium by taking up the cause of the Boers at the time of the Second Boer War.

Rentoul was a fine scholar, learning all his life, and his erudition, keen wit, versatility, strength of conviction, and scorn of compromise, made him a remarkable preacher and lecturer. As a debater he had great readiness in retort, and in developing his argument his words flowed with an almost volcanic passion.

In private life he was courteous, kindly and generous. His elder daughter, Annie Rattray Rentoul, wrote verse with some ability. A list of volumes of her songs which were set to music will be found in Percival Serle's A Bibliography of Australasian Poetry and Verse. The younger daughter, Ida Sherbourne, afterwards Mrs Ida Rentoul Outhwaite, became well known as an illustrator of fairy tales.

References

1846 births
1926 deaths
Irish emigrants to colonial Australia
Australian Presbyterian ministers
20th-century Australian poets
Alumni of Queen's University Belfast
People from Garvagh
Australian military chaplains
Academic staff of the University of Melbourne
Presbyterian ministers from Northern Ireland
Ulster Scots people